Whitney, My Love is the first book published by author Judith McNaught. While written first, it is the second novel in the Westmoreland Dynasty Saga, preceded by A Kingdom of Dreams (1989) and followed by Until You (1994), "Miracles" (1995/7), and Someone Like You (2017).

The novel was originally published in 1985 by Pocket Books, a branch of Simon & Schuster, Inc.

Synopsis

Plot 
After a young Whitney Stone's mother dies, her father Martin is unable to handle her tomboyish antics and sends Whitney off to France with her aunt and uncle, Lady Anne and Lord Edward Gilbert, a diplomat. Whitney is separated from her childhood love, a significantly older Paul Sevarin, who does not return her affections. Before leaving, she vows to come home from France and marry Paul. While in France, she is educated by a variety of language, dance, and etiquette tutors, coming to age as a fashionable and witty young lady. She also meets the DuVille family, becoming close friends with the daughter Therèse and their son Nicolas (Nicki). Around the age of 19, Whitney attends a party in France where she meets a mysterious stranger. Shortly after, she is recalled back to England by her father. To the surprise of her small town, Whitney returns as a sophisticated young lady. Furthermore, possessing what she believes is a substantial inheritance from her grandmother, Whitney is determined to marry Paul.

Once home, Martin hosts a party for Whitney to reintroduce her to the town and their new neighbor, a Mr. Clayton Westland. Whitney is disinterested, focusing her attention on Paul. She and Paul have a flirtation, which Whitney believes leads to a serious courtship, despite her father's efforts to push her towards Mr. Westland. When Paul proposes, Whitney eagerly tells her father, only for him to reveal that he had spent her dowry and sold her in marriage to the Duke of Claymore in exchange for a large sum of money to save the family home from ruin. Martin also reveals that Mr. Westland is the Duke of Claymore and slaps Whitney, much to Clayton's displeasure. Whitney begs Clayton to keep the engagement a secret and he acquiesces on the condition that she break off the engagement with Paul. Convinced they can run away and pay back the dowry money her father spent, Whitney reveals the situation to Paul. Instead, Paul is angry as he had already started spending her dowry money. Resigned, Whitney accepts her status

Clayton and Whitney begin a tentative courtship, filled with passion. The beginning of the relationship is tumultuous, with the apex being a controversial rape scene.

Whitney and Clayton become estranged due to miscommunication. Whitney's cousin Emily, aware of the entire story, contrives to bring Whitney and Clayton back together at Elizabeth's wedding. While this initially does not work, Whitney and Clayton ultimately reunite and become happy parents.

Main Characters 
Characters from the Westmoreland Dynasty Saga universe appear across the novels. From this era, Whitney, Clayton, and Stephen appear in Until You, with Clayton and Stephen's ancestor, Royce Westmoreland, as the main character in A Kingdom of Dreams.

 Whitney Stone
 Clayton Westmoreland, Duke of Claymore
 Paul Sevarin, Whitney's girlhood crush 
 Nicolas DuVille, Whitney's friend and suitor
 Martin Stone, father of Whitney
 Anne Gilbert, Whitney's aunt
 Edward Gilbert, Whitney's uncle
 Emily Williams, Whitney's cousin
 Elizabeth Ashton, Whitney's childhood acquaintance and adulthood friend
 Peter Redfern, Elizabeth's husband
 Stephen Westmoreland, brother of Clayton (main character in Until You)

Style and Themes 
Eloisa James, romance novelist and professor, cites Whitney, My Love as introducing her to the works of McNaught. James cals her a "brilliant tutor" in the craft of romance, especially through suspending reality and creating romantic relationships in her novels.

Utilizing the genre of romance, McNaught is able to create a link between the reader and the heroine. Through this connection, readers feel as if they are the ones receiving the attention and desire from the male hero. Furthermore, the codes and language within the romance novel genre, create a community of female readers sharing in similar emotions and knowledge.

Release history 

After the initial publication in 1985, Whitney, My Love was adapted by a number of publishers to at least 6 different languages and four formats. Languages include English, French, Russian, Brazilian Portuguese, Hungarian, Spanish, and Italian. The book was published as a hardback, paperback, large print book, and eBook. Most notably, the 1999/2000 edition and republication resulted in a 180-page addition to the original story, changing at least two scenes and extending the final ending.

References

1985 American novels
American romance novels